El Ángel commonly refers to the Angel of Independence in Mexico City.

El Ángel may also refer to:

 El Ángel (wrestler) (born 1997), Mexican luchador
 El Ángel, Ecuador, Carchi province
 El Angel (film), a 2018 Argentine-Spanish film
 El Ángel station, in Lima, Peru
 El Ángel (Mexico City Metrobús)

See also 
 Ángel, a given name
 Angel (disambiguation)